Emmanuel Kwasi Mireku, professionally known as Elder Mireku, (born, 12 January 1961) is a Ghanaian Gospel Musician and a songwriter who has been in the industry for more than 40 years.

Early life and education 
Mireku was born to Emmanuel Kofi Mireku and Comfort Asiedua Mirekua. He comes from Kwahu Obomeng and Kwahu Atibie in the Eastern Region and has lived the majority of his life in Koforidua.  Elder Mireku had his basic education at Presbyterian Elementary Schools and furthered at the Koforidua Technical Institute.

Music career 
Mireku's ministry began in the late 1970s.  His worship songs earned him a Honorary Doctorate in sacred music from the Ecclesiastical Bishops And Leaders Conference of Africa (affiliated to the Kayiwa International University, Uganda) in 2016. Elder Mireku has greatly influenced the gospel music industry and musicians in Ghana. He has 56 albums and an average of 10 songs on each album. He has over 500 songs some of which include "Oko no wako awie", "odimafo(tongues)", "Hallelujah" and "Mempa Aba". He was honored with a life-time achievement award at the maiden edition of Ghana Music Awards South Africa.

Personal life 
He is married to Philomina Mireku and they have two children, Evelyn and James. In a video during one of his performances, Elder Mireku revealed that he had once contemplated suicide after his dream of continuing his education was shattered.

Discography

Albums 

 Bibiara Nye Den (2019)
 Elder Mireku Worship Songs 4 (2018)
 Jesus Wakasa (2019)
 Mempa Aba (2019)
Wasem Ye Nokware Mame (2019)
Halleluya - Praise & Worship 41
Okamafo Nyame
Empa Aba
Best Of Worship
Sarah Anya Nede
Menya Adom Bi
Magenkwa
Praises Vol.1

References 

Living people
Koforidua
Koforidua Senior High Technical School alumni
Ghanaian musicians
Ghanaian gospel singers
People from Eastern Region (Ghana)
1961 births